The year 1509 in science and technology included many events, some of which are listed here.

Exploration
 September 11 – Diogo Lopes de Sequeira reaches Malacca, having crossed the Gulf of Bengal.

Geology
 September 10 – Constantinople earthquake.

Mathematics
 June 11 – Luca Pacioli's De divina proportione, concerning the golden ratio, is published in Venice, with illustrations by Leonardo da Vinci.

Births
 Bernardino Telesio, Italian philosopher and natural scientist (died 1588)
 possible date – Guillaume Le Testu, French privateer, explorer and cartographer (k. 1573)

Deaths
 Juan de la Cosa, Spanish explorer and cartographer (b. c. 1460)

References

 
16th century in science
1500s in science